Senkovo is a rural locality (a settlement) in Oktyabrskoye Rural Settlement, Vyaznikovsky District, Vladimir Oblast, Russia. The population was 81 as of 2010.

Geography 
Senkovo is located 11 km southwest of Vyazniki (the district's administrative centre) by road. Oktyabrsky is the nearest rural locality.

References 

Rural localities in Vyaznikovsky District